Uri Shaked (Hebrew: אורי שקד; born: 15 June 1943) is an Israeli professor of Electrical Engineering in the Engineering Faculty at Tel Aviv University, specializing in control theory of uncertain systems. In 2017 he was awarded the Israel Prize for engineering research.

Early life and education
Uri Shaked was born in Petah Tikva, Israel. He studied at "Brenner" high school and received his B.Sc in Physics and Mathematics (1963) and M.Sc in Physics (1966) from the Hebrew University. His Ph.D. degree was received in 1974 from the Department of Applied Mathematics at the Weizmann Institute of Science in Rehovot, Israel. Shaked authored the thesis Synthesis of Multivariable Linear Time Invariant Feedback Control Systems, under the supervision of Prof. Isaac M. Horowitz.

Career
Shaked was a visiting scholar at Cambridge, UK in the years 1974-1976, and then joined the Department of Engineering at Tel Aviv University as a lecturer. He became a senior lecturer in 1977. In 1981 he was also an adjunct lecturer at the Electrical Engineering Faculty of the Technion, and in 1982 he became an associate professor at the Engineering faculty of Tel Aviv university.
In 1983-1984 he was a visiting associate professor at the Department of Electrical Engineering and Computer Science, University of California, Berkeley.
 
In 1985, Shaked became the head of the Electrical Engineering - Systems Department at Tel Aviv and founded the Tel Aviv University Special Program for Practical Electronic Engineers. He was the chairman of the program, which enabled practical electronic engineers to become professional engineers, until 1987. 
 
Shaked was promoted to a full professor at Tel Aviv University in 1987, and held the chair of Celia and Marcos Maus Professor of Computer Systems Engineering (1989-2013). In 1989-1990 he was a Visiting Professor at Yale University, and in the years 1993-1998 he was the dean of the Engineering faculty at Tel Aviv University.
 
In 1999 Shaked was a Visiting Professor at the Imperial College of Science and Technology, Dept. of Electrical and Electronic Engineering in London, UK.
Shaked was on the board of directors of Tel Aviv University in the years 2005-2009. In 2011 he retired from Tel Aviv as professor emeritus.
 
In 2017 he was elected as chairman of the Israeli section of the Institute of Electrical and Electronics Engineers (IEEE).

Work
His research interests include linear and non-linear control of uncertain systems; digital control; H-infinity optimization in filtering and control; control and estimation of systems with time delay.
 
Upon receiving the Israel Prize (2017) for engineering research, his work and its implications were described by the award committee:

Membership in professional societies
 1993-   Fellow of IEEE, Control Systems Society 
 2011-  Fellow of the Institute of Mathematics and its Applications, UK (IMA)

Publications
Prof. Shaked has authored more than 260 scientific publications, including three monographs.

Books

 E. Gershon, U. Shaked and I. Yaesh, H_infinity Control and Estimation of State-multiplicative Linear Systems (LNCIS 318), LondonSpringer 2005
 E. Gershon and U. Shaked, Advanced Topics in Control and Estimation of State-multiplicative Noisy Systems (LNCIS 439), LondonSpringer 2013
 E. Gershon and U. Shaked, Advances in H∞ Control Theory: Switched, Delayed and Biological Systems. (LNCIS 481), LondonSpringer 2019

Selected articles
 1976: U. Shaked, “A General Transfer Function Approach to the Steady-State Linear Quadratic Gaussian Stochastic Control Problem”, Int. J. Control 24, pp. 771–800
 1976: B. Kouvaritakis and U. Shaked, “Asymptotic Behavior of Root-Loci of Multivariable Systems”, Int. J. Control 23, pp. 297–340
 1992: I. Yaesh and U. Shaked, “Game Theory Approach to Optimal Linear State Estimation and Its Relation to the Minimum H∞-Norm Estimation”, IEEE Trans. Autom. Control, AC-37, pp. 828–831
 1995: U. Shaked and C. E. de Souza, “Robust Minimum Variance Filtering”, IEEE Trans. on Signal Processing SP-43, pp. 2474–2483
 1996: Y. Theodor and U. Shaked, “Robust Discrete-Time Minimum Variance Filtering”, IEEE Trans. on Signal Processing SP-44, pp. 181–189
 1996: N. Berman and U. Shaked, “H∞ Nonlinear Filtering”, Int. J. of Robust and Nonlinear Control 6, pp. 281–295
 2002: E. Fridman and U. Shaked, “A Descriptor System Approach to H∞ Control of Linear Time-Delay Systems”, IEEE Trans. on Automat. Contr. AC-47, pp. 253–270
 2002: E. Fridman and U. Shaked, “An Improved Stabilization Method for Linear Time-Delay Systems”, IEEE Trans. on Automat. Contr. AC-47, pp. 1931–1937
 2003: E. Fridman and U. Shaked, “Delay Dependent Stability and H∞ Control: Constant and Time-Varying Delays”, Int. J. Control 76, 1, pp 48–60
 2005: V. Suplin and U. Shaked, “Robust H∞ Output-Feedback Control of Linear Discrete-Time Systems”, System & Control Letters 54, pp. 799–808
 2008: E. Gershon and U. Shaked,“H∞ Output-Feedback Control of Discrete-Time Systems With State-Multiplicative Noise.” Automatica, vol. 44, pp. 574–579 
 2012: L. I. Allerhand and U. Shaked, “Robust State Dependant Switching of Linear Systems With Dwell Time”, IEEE Trans. Automat. Contr. 58, pp. 994–1001
 2019: E. Gershon and U. Shaked, “Robust Predictor Based Control of State Multiplicative Noisy Retarded Systems”, Systems and Control Letters, Volume 132

Personal life
Shaked is married to Zippora, a professor at the Weizmann Institute of Science in Rehovot. They have two daughters and 5 grandchildren, and live in Rehovot.

External links
 Uri Shaked, Tel Aviv University
 Uri Shaked, DBLP 
 An Interview With Prof. Uri Shaked (in Hebrew), Kan Reshet Bet

References

1943 births
Israeli scientists
Living people
Academic staff of Tel Aviv University
Israel Prize in technology and engineering recipients